Dutton/Dunwich is a municipality located in western Elgin County in Southwestern Ontario, Canada.

The municipality was formed in 1998 through an amalgamation of the Village of Dutton and former Township of Dunwich.  It includes the Hamlets of Wallacetown, Duttona Beach, and the western parts of both Iona and Iona Station. It is bisected both by Highway 401 and by the rail lines of the Penn Central Railroad and the Chesapeake & Ohio Railway.

Dutton/Dunwich has a large farming community involving a variety of agricultural methods. The region is primarily made up of inhabitants of English ancestry, with minorities of Scottish, Portuguese, and Dutch heritage.

Demographics 

Education
Dunwich-Dutton Public School is located in the village of Dutton, and managed by the Thames Valley District School Board. The school was built in 1927 and was a high school, until June 1952. It became a K-8 school in January 1953, and was restructured again in September 1973, from when it has educated in K-6.In 2016 the school was once again changed to a JK-8 school following the closure of WESES.

Tyrconnell

Tyrconnell is a ghost town located south of Wallacetown. Settled in 1809, the mill settlement lost out to Port Burwell and Port Stanley when railways extended to the area in the 1850s.

Notable people
 John Kenneth Galbraith, (Scholar, and economic adviser to U.S. President John F. Kennedy) was born in Iona Station, Ontario in 1908 and died 2006.
 Ellis Wellwood Sifton VC (12 October 1891 – 9 April 1917) was a Canadian recipient of the Victoria Cross, the highest and most prestigious award for gallantry in the face of the enemy that can be awarded to British and Commonwealth forces, earned at the Battle of Vimy Ridge. 
 James Dunn (b. 2000), member of Canada's 2018 Paralympic Hockey Team, is from the hamlet of Wallacetown.
 Elaine Keillor (b. 1939), C.M., ARCT, PhD., Hon. Mus. Doc. lived in Wallacetown until her marriage in 1963.

See also
List of townships in Ontario

References

External links 

Lower-tier municipalities in Ontario
Municipalities in Elgin County